The Survivors' and Salvagers' Camp – 1715 Fleet is a historic site on North Hutchinson Island, Florida. Survivors of the destroyed 1715 Spanish Treasure Fleet established a camp at this location while awaiting rescue. Salvors also used the site as they recovered sunken treasure from the 1715 fleet. Currently, the McLarty Treasure Museum occupies part of the area.

References

External links
Site of Survivors' and Salvagers' Camp - The 1715 Fleet. Information from the Florida Historical Markers Program website.
Spanish Fleet Survivors and Salvors Camp. Information from the National Park Service website.

Archaeology of shipwrecks
Spanish Florida
National Register of Historic Places in Indian River County, Florida
Geography of Indian River County, Florida
National Register of Historic Places in Florida